Willems is a patronymic surname of Dutch origin, equivalent to Williams. In 2008, it was the 6th most common surname in Belgium (18,604 people)  and in 2007 it was the 39th most common surname in the Netherlands (17,042 people)..

People with this surname
 Daniel Willems (1956–2016), Belgian road cyclist
 Dirk Willems (d. 1569), Dutch anabaptist martyr
 Edgar Willems (1890–1978), Belgian artist and musician
 Eddy Willems (b. 1962), Belgian security expert
  (1905–1997), German-American sociologist and ethnologist
 Florent Joseph Marie Willems (1823–1905), Belgian painter
 Frederik Willems (b. 1979), Belgian road cyclist
 Gerard Willems (b. 1946), Dutch-born Australian pianist
 Gladys Willems (b. 1977), Belgian archer
 Hans Willems (b. 1934), Dutch Olympic sailor
 Henri Willems (1899–?), Belgian bobsledder
 Jan Willems a.k.a. Yankey Willems (died 1688), Dutch buccaneer
 Jan Camiel Willems (1939–2013), Belgian mathematician
 Jan Frans Willems (1793–1846), Flemish writer
 Jean-Pierre Willems (1886–?), Belgian fencer
 Jennifer Willems (1947–2015), Dutch actress
 Jeroen Willems (1962–2012), Dutch actor and singer
 Jetro Willems (b. 1994), Dutch footballer
  (b. 1970), Belgian cinematographer
 Ko Willems (1900–1983), Dutch track cyclist
 Louis Willems (1822–1907), Belgian physician and bacteriologist
 Ludwig Willems (b. 1966), Belgian road cyclist
 Maurice Willems (b. 1929), Belgian footballer
 Menno Willems (b. 1977), Dutch footballer
 Michael Willems (b. 1959), Dutch/Canadian Photographer
 Mo Willems (b. 1968), American writer, animator, author and illustrator
 Nathan Willems (b. c.1981), American politician in Iowa
 (1912–1997), Belgian novelist and playwright
 Pierre Willems (1840–1898), Dutch philologist and historian of Ancient Rome
 Rein Willems (b. 1945), Dutch businessman
 Ron Willems (b. 1966), Dutch footballer
 Sandrine Willems (b. 1968), Belgian writer and documentary maker
 Steeven Willems (b. 1990), French footballer
 Theo Willems (1891–1960), Dutch archer
  (b. 1955), Dutch composer
  (b. 1954), Duch sculptor
 Victor Willems (1877–1918), Belgian fencer
  (1950–2014), Dutch archaeologist

See also
 Willems, Nord, a commune of France
 Willem
 Willemse
 Willemsen

Dutch-language surnames
Patronymic surnames
Surnames of Belgian origin
Surnames from given names